Raising the Roof is a 1972 British comedy film directed by Michael Forlong and featuring Michael Gould, Patricia Davis, Roy Kinnear, David Lodge and Patricia Hayes.

Synopsis
An unusual pet competition is being held at a local cinema's Saturday matinee.

Cast
 Michael Gould as Jack
 Patricia Davis as Jill
 Ian Allis as Clyde Burke
 Kay Skinner as Bonnie Burke
 Michael McVey as Rod
 Roy Kinnear as Dad Burke
 David Lodge as Manager
 Barrie Gosney as Robbins
 Jean Moran as Mrs. Robbins
 Patricia Hayes as Aunt Maud
 Tutte Lemkow as Alf
 Robertson Hare as Old Gent
 John Russell as himself, The Duke of Bedford

Production
Sponsored by the Children's Film Foundation.
The film was classified as "universal" suitable for audiences aged four years and over.

References

External links

1972 films
1972 comedy films
1970s British films
1970s English-language films
British comedy films
Children's Film Foundation
Films directed by Michael Forlong